Lotus silk ( or) is a type of textile produced using delicate lotus stem fibers. The fabric first originated in Myanmar (Burma), and is now also woven by smaller-scale cottage industries in Vietnam. Due to the complexity and labor-intensive nature of weaving lotus fibers, lotus silk is considered one of the most expensive fabrics in the world. Burmese lotus silk uses fibres from a specific variety of lotus called padonma kya (ပဒုမ္မာကြာ), which produces large, fragrant pink flowers.

Lotus sources 
In Myanmar, lotus stems are sourced from lakes throughout Myanmar, including Shan State's Inle Lake, Sunye Lake in Mandalay Region's Sintkaing Township; Inma Lake in Bago Region's Thegon Township; Wetthe and Salin Natural Lakes in Magway Region's Salin Township; and Kandaunggyi Lake in Sagaing Region's Taze Township. 

In Vietnam, lotus stems are sourced from the large lakes of Hanoi.

History 

Lotus silk weaving originated in Inle Lake in Myanmar's Shan State. Lotus weaving was invented by an ethnic Intha woman named Sa Oo in the village of Kyaingkhan in the early 1900s. She first wove a Buddhist monastic robe using lotus fibers, called kya thingan (ကြာသင်္ကန်း), as an offering to the abbot of a local monastery, and offered similar monastic robes to the principal Buddha images at Phaung Taw Oo Pagoda. The tradition of robe-weaving has a long history in Myanmar; during the Tazaungdaing festival, robe-weaving competitions are held throughout major Burmese pagodas.

The weaving practice went extinct after her death, and was subsequently revived by her relatives, Tun Yee and Ohn Kyi, who began a cooperative to modernize and systematize the weaving practice. 

In 2017, Phan Thi Thuan, a weaver near Hanoi, introduced the weaving practice to Vietnam. She has successfully researched and made lotus silk. To pull 25 kg of silk thread, she needs 100 tons of lotus stem.

In 2019, Bijiyashanti Tongbram from Manipur, India, began making lotus silk using lotus stems gathered from the Loktak Lake.

Uses 

Lotus silk was first used to weave monastic robes as an offering to Buddha images or Buddhist monks, but is now also used for a variety of clothing types, including scarves and hats.

Loro Piana, a luxury clothing company, has imported Burmese lotus silk to produce jackets and other clothing products since 2010.

References

See also 

 Burmese clothing

Burmese culture
Textiles
Textile arts of Myanmar
Fibers
Nelumbo